was a town located in Inabe District, Mie Prefecture, Japan.

On December 1, 2003, Inabe absorbed the towns of Hokusei, Daian and Fujiwara (all from Inabe District) to create the city of Inabe.

Dissolved municipalities of Mie Prefecture